Heterdaad is a Belgian television series that originally aired on Eén from 1996 to 1999 and handles about the activities of BOB, the former Belgian security and search brigade which was part of the gendarmerie. It was the intention to produce 5 seasons but as the BOB was dismantled season 5 was never made. 40 episodes were made over four seasons.

Series overview

Episodes

Season 1 (1996)

Season 2 (1997)

Season 3 (1998)

Season 4 (1999)

External links

References 

Heterdaad